Jonathan Ozziel Herrera Morales (born 25 May 2001) is a Mexican professional footballer who plays as a winger for Liga MX club Atlas.

Early life
Herrera was born in Culiacán, Sinaloa to a Afro-Cuban father and a Mexican mother. His father began his career in Mexico as a personal trainer at the age of 22 years old in the Institute of Sinaloense Sports.

Club career

Youth
Herrera joined Pachuca's youth academy in 2014. Then moving on to Club Atlas Academy in 2016 where he managed settle down. He continued through Atlas Youth Academy successfully going through U-15, U-17, and U-20. Until finally reaching the first team to debut in Liga MX, Ángel Guillermo Hoyos being the coach giving herrera the opportunity to join the first team.

Atlas
Herrera made his professional debut in Liga MX against Monterrey, which ended in a 3–1 loss. Herrera subbing in the last 20 minutes of the game.

International career
In October 2021, Herrera made his under-21 debut in a friendly match against the Romania under-21 national team. He was called up by Raúl Chabrand to participate with the under-21 team at the 2022 Maurice Revello Tournament, where Mexico finished the tournament in third place.

Career statistics

Club

Honours
Atlas
Liga MX: Apertura 2021, Clausura 2022
Campeón de Campeones: 2022

See also
Afro-Mexicans

References

External links
Ozziel Herrera at Soccerway 
Ozziel Herrera at football Database 
Ozziel Herrera at Official Liga MX Profile

Atlas F.C. footballers
2001 births
Living people
Association football forwards
Mexican footballers
Mexico youth international footballers
Mexican people of Cuban descent
Footballers from Sinaloa
Sportspeople from Culiacán
21st-century Mexican people